Elizabeth Mataka was the United Nations Special Envoy for HIV/AIDS in Africa, as appointed on 21 May 2007 by UN Secretary-General Ban Ki-moon, replacing Stephen Lewis. She served in this position till 13 July 2012. Mataka is a national of Botswana and a resident of Zambia. She served as the vice-chair of the board of the Global Fund to Fight AIDS, Tuberculosis and Malaria.

References

External links
 Secretary-General Appoints Elizabeth Mataka, United Nations, 21 May 2007

HIV/AIDS activists
HIV/AIDS in Africa
Living people
Zambian activists
Zambian women activists
Botswana health activists
Year of birth missing (living people)
Botswana officials of the United Nations
Botswana expatriates in Zambia
Special Envoys of the Secretary-General of the United Nations